Oluwatosin "Tosin" Aiyegun (born 26 June 1998) is a professional footballer who plays for FC Zürich. Born in Nigeria, he plays for the Benin national team.

Club career
On 2 September 2019, Aiyegun joined Swiss club FC Zürich on a contract until the summer 2023.

International career
Aiyegun was born in Nigeria to a Nigerian father and Beninese mother. He was called up to the Benin national team for a set of friendlies in March 2022. He debuted with Benin in a 4–0 friendly win over Liberia on 24 March 2022, scoring a goal in his debut.

References

External links

1998 births
Living people
Beninese people of Nigerian descent
Nigerian people of Beninese descent
Sportspeople from Lagos
Beninese footballers
Nigerian footballers
Association football midfielders
Benin international footballers
Real Sapphire F.C. players
FK Ventspils players
FC Zürich players
Latvian Higher League players
Swiss Super League players
Beninese expatriate footballers
Nigerian expatriate footballers
Expatriate footballers in Latvia
Nigerian expatriate sportspeople in Latvia
Expatriate footballers in Switzerland
Nigerian expatriate sportspeople in Switzerland